This article lists films set in the city of Rome during the Roman Kingdom, the Roman Republic, or the Roman Empire.  The films only partly set in Rome are so noted.

The founding of Rome
Films set during the founding of Rome include:

The Roman Kingdom

Reign of Romulus

Reign of Tullus Hostilius

The Roman Republic

Early Roman Republic

Second Punic War

Third Punic War

2nd century BC

Third Servile War

Julius Caesar

Cleopatra

The Roman Empire

1st century BC

The Life of Jesus

Reigns of Augustus, Tiberius, Caligula and Claudius

Reign of Nero

Boudica's Revolt

Eruption of Mount Vesuvius

Flavian Dynasty

85-110 AD

Reign of Hadrian

Reign of Antoninus Pius

Reign of Commodus

250-272 AD

Reign of Diocletian

310-315 AD (Age of Constantine)

Attila the Hun

Late Empire

Undated

See also
 Fiction set in ancient Rome for a comprehensive list of all works of fiction (including films set in ancient Rome)
 Fiction set in ancient Greece
 Lists of historical films
 List of films set in ancient Egypt
 List of films set in ancient Greece
 List of films based on classical mythology
 List of Asterix films

Lists of historical films
Ancient Rome-related lists
Films by period of setting